Samina Khan (born 20 December 1970) is a Pakistani politician who was a Member of the Provincial Assembly of Balochistan, from May 2013 to May 2018.

Early life and education
Khan was born on 20 December 1970 in Kalat, Pakistan.

Khan holds a degree of the Master of Public Administration.

Political career

She was elected to the Provincial Assembly of Balochistan as a candidate of Pakistan Muslim League (N) on a reserved seat for women in 2013 Pakistani general election.

References

Living people
Balochistan MPAs 2013–2018
Women members of the Provincial Assembly of Balochistan
Pakistan Muslim League (N) politicians
1970 births
21st-century Pakistani women politicians